,  born  and also known as Dom Justo Takayama (c. 1552 – 3 or 5 February 1615) was a Japanese Catholic Kirishitan daimyō and samurai who lived during the Sengoku period that witnessed anti-Catholic sentiment. 

Takayama had been baptized into the faith in 1564 when he was twelve, though over time neglected his faith due to his actions as a samurai. He eventually rekindled his faith just after his coming-of-age ritual near the age of 20. He abandoned his status to devote himself to his faith and was exiled to Manila, where he lived a life of holiness until his death two months later.

His cause for sainthood began when he was declared a Servant of God. Reports in 2014 indicated that he would be beatified sometime in 2015 but Pope Francis later approved it on 21 January 2016; the beatification celebration occurred on 7 February 2017 in Osaka with Cardinal Angelo Amato presiding over the beatification on the pope's behalf.

Biography
Dom Justo Takayama was the eldest son (thus the heir) of Takayama Tomoteru who was the lord of the Sawa Castle in the Yamato Province. His name as a child was Hikogorō (彦五郎). In 1564 his father converted to Roman Catholicism after meeting with Portuguese missionaries and Hikogorō was baptized as Justo (Latin: Iustus; Japanese: ジュスト or ユスト, based on Portuguese or Latin pronunciation). After his coming-of-age celebration he was named as Shigetomo (重友). However he is better known as Takayama Ukon (高山右近), "Ukon" being a title. Europeans also referred to him as Dom Justo "Ucondono" (from 右近殿, Ukon-dono).

In 1571 he fought in an important and successful battle all as part of his coming-of-age ritual which culminated in a duel to the death with a compatriot whom he killed; but Takayama received grievous wounds in the process and during his convalescence realized he had cared little about the faith that had received him and had been imparted to him.

He later married in 1574 and went on to have three sons (two died as infants) and one daughter. Justo and his father fought through the turbulent age to secure their position as a daimyō, he  managed to acquire the Takatsuki Castle (in Takatsuki, Osaka) and participated in Ishiyama Hongan-ji War (1570-1580) under the warlord Oda Nobunaga and also under the daimyō Toyotomi Hideyoshi during his rule's earlier times, participating in the Battle of Yamazaki (1582), Battle of Shizugatake (1583) and Siege of Kagoshima (1587). During their domination of Takatsuki region he and his father pushed their policies as kirishitan daimyōs. There were several of their subjects who converted to the faith under their guiding influence. During his reign, Takayama destroyed numerous Buddhist temples and Shinto shrines in both Takatsuki and Akashi. However, in due course Hideyoshi became hostile towards the Christian faith and in 1587 ordered the expulsion of all missionaries and that all Christian daimyōs renounce their faith. While several daimyō obeyed this order and renounced Roman Catholicism it was he who proclaimed that he would not give up his faith and would rather give up his land and all that he owned.

Takayama lived under the protection of Maeda Toshiie for several decades but in 1614 Tokugawa Ieyasu (the ruler at the time) prohibited the Christian faith which witnessed Takayama's expulsion from Japan. On 8 November 1614 – with 300 Japanese Christians – he left his home from Nagasaki. He arrived at Manila on 11 December 1614 where he received a warm welcome from the Spanish Jesuits and the local Filipinos. The governor Juan de Silva wished to provide him with an income to support him and his relations but he declined this offer since he said he was no longer in a position to offer his services in exchange for income but neither did he wish to act like a lord.

The colonial government of Spanish Philippines offered to overthrow the Japanese Empire through an invasion of Japan in order to protect the Japanese Christians and place him into a position of great power and influence. Takayama declined to participate and was even opposed to the plan.

Death
He died of illness at midnight on 3 or 5 February 1615, 44 days after having arrived in Manila after having suffered from a violent fever. Upon his death, the Spanish government gave him a Christian burial replete with full military honors befitting a daimyō. His remains were buried in the Jesuit church there and this made him the only daimyō to be buried on Philippine soil.

Statues

At Plaza Dilao in Paco, Manila, the last vestige of the old town where around 3000 Japanese immigrants lived after the expulsion, a statue of Takayama stands depicting him in the traditional samurai garb and a topknot. He is holding a sheathed katana that is pointed downward upon which hangs a figure of a crucified Jesus Christ. The University of Santo Tomas also has a statue in honor of Takayama in front of the Thomas Aquinas Research Complex building.

Beatification
His cause for sainthood started at a diocesan level which resulted in the validation of the process on 10 June 1994 after the Congregation for the Causes of Saints were given all the boxes of documentation pertaining to the cause. The commencement to the cause saw him titled as a Servant of God. There had been failed attempts to start the cause in the past. The first attempt came in 1630 when the Manila priests decided to commence it but this failed due to the isolationist Japanese policies which prevented the collection of the documentation that was needed; the petition was presented but was rejected. The second attempt in 1965 failed due to several errors being made. In October 2012, a letter was presented to Pope Benedict XVI asking for the cause to be re-examined.

The Positio dossier was submitted in 2013 to the competent authorities in Rome for further assessment. According to Cardinal Angelo Amato, the beatification would have occurred in 2015 on 21 October 2014 to Japanese pilgrims; 2015 marked four centuries after his death but the formal beatification did not occur since it was close to completion at that stage. His cause was to meant to confirm - in a rather unorthodox case - that Ukon was a martyr because of the treatment he received and because he renounced all he had to pursue and profess his faith.

Historical consultants met to discuss the cause on 10 December 2013 while the theologians likewise met on 20 May 2014 to discuss and then vote on the cause. The cardinals and bishop members of the C.C.S. met on 18 June 2015 to make a final decision on the cause before could go to Pope Francis for his approval though had to meet again on 12 January 2016. Pope Francis – on 21 January 2016 – approved Takayama's beatification; it was celebrated in Osaka on 7 February 2017 with Cardinal Amato presiding on the pope's behalf.

In popular culture
In NHK's Taiga drama (an annual historical television series) for 2014, Gunshi Kanbei, Ikuta Tōma assumed the role of Takayama.

In 2016, there was a documentary about Takayama Ukon's life entitled Ukon il samurai that was released.

See also
 Naitō Julia

Persecution of Christians in Japan
26 Martyrs of Japan
History of the Catholic Church in Japan
Caius of Korea

References

External links
Samurai archives
Hagiography Circle
Takayama Ukon

1552 births
1615 deaths
16th-century Japanese people
16th-century venerated Christians
17th-century Japanese people
17th-century venerated Christians
Beatifications by Pope Francis
Catholic Church in Japan
Catholic Church in the Philippines
Converts to Roman Catholicism
Daimyo
Japan–Philippines relations
Japanese beatified people
Japanese expatriates in the Philippines
Japanese Roman Catholics
People from Ibaraki, Osaka
People of Spanish colonial Philippines
Samurai